The Tragedy of Llogara refers to a bus accident and helicopter crash near Himare, Albania. On 22 November 1989, a bus carrying students from the Agricultural University of Tirana fell from a ravine and crashed along the mountainous road between Himara and Vuno in Albania. As a result, Albanian authorities sent 2 helicopters aiding in the transportation of the casualties back to Tirana. However, the weather conditions were deteriorating with heavy fog in the area. Despite such a setback, pilots decided to fly back to Tirana carrying the casualties, only to crash their helicopters on a mountain side near Vuno and Llogora respectively killing all people aboard.

External links
 Helicopter crash details
 Tragjedia e Llogarasë, dokumenti sekret, pse u rrëzuan helikopterët

1989 in Albania
1989 road incidents
Bus incidents in Albania
Himara
November 1989 events in Europe
1989 disasters in Albania